The 1969 LPGA Championship was the fifteenth LPGA Championship, held July 24–27 at Concord Golf Club in Kiamesha Lake, New York. Betsy Rawls won her second LPGA Championship, four strokes ahead of runners-up Carol Mann and Susie Maxwell Berning.  She began the final round three strokes behind co-leaders Mann and Marlene Hagge. At age 41, it was Rawls' eighth and final major title; her previous major win was nine years earlier.

The record field of 63 players required the championship's first 36-hole cut, which reduced the weekend field to 41 women.

Past champions in the field

Source:

Final leaderboard
Sunday, July 27, 1969

Source:

References

External links
Golf Stats leaderboard
Monster Golf Club

Women's PGA Championship
Golf in New York (state)
LPGA Championship
LPGA Championship
LPGA Championship
LPGA Championship
Sullivan County, New York
Women's sports in New York (state)